= Sinchuk Hwanguk =

- Hangul: 신축환국
- Hanja: 辛丑換局
- Revised Romanization: Sinchuk Hwanguk
- McCune–Reischauer: Sinch'uk Hwan'guk

The Sinchuk Hwanguk (Korean: 신축환국) occurred in 1721. The Noron faction loses power in the aftermath of Shinyim Oksa.
